Bela or Vela was a medieval fortress town and bishopric in Epirus, northwestern Greece.

History 
Bela is located near the site of the modern Vella Monastery, some 2 km south of Kalpaki. The name is of Slavic origin. The fortress survived until the mid-20th century, when it was documented by N. G. L. Hammond; however, the Second World War and its aftermath, as well as the operation of a quarry on the eastern side of the hill, have destroyed most of the remains described by Hammond.

Bela first appears in the mid-10th century, when the Byzantine Empire's Notitiae Episcopatuum mention the see of "Photice, that is Bela" (Φωτικῆς ἤτοι Βελᾶς), implying that the seat of the bishopric of Photice, a suffragan of the Metropolis of Naupaktos, had been moved to Bela. This move was temporary, since from the mid-11th century, Photice is again mentioned without further additions. Its only recorded bishop during that time, Constantine, is known from a 10th-century episcopal seal.

From the early 13th century, however, Bela is attested as a separate bishopric, held by Manuel Makres. It is possible that during the 13th century, Bela formed also a province (theme), but this is unclear. It appears that by 1367, Bela and nearby Dryinopolis were no longer suffragans of Naupaktos, but of the Metropolis of Ioannina, as indeed is confirmed from the late 15th century on.

In 1380, Bela was captured by the Ottoman Turks under Lala Şahin Pasha, but in 1382 it came under the control of John Spata's son-in-law Marchesano.

Catholic titular see 
The see, Eastern Orthodox throughout its existence, was nominally restored in 1933 as a Latin Catholic titular bishopric. It has had the following incumbents:

 José Alves Martins (1935.11.15 – death 1950.04.14) as emeritate
 Bernardo Arango Henao, Jesuits (S.J.) (1950.04.18 – 1962.10.27), while Apostolic Vicar of Barrancabermeja (Colombia)
 Gerard William Tickle (1963.10.12 – death 1994.09.14), while Military Vicar of Great Britain (UK) (1963.10.12 – 1978.04.24) and on emeritate
 Gerald Frederick Kicanas (1995.03.20 – 2001.10.30), while Auxiliary Bishop of Chicago (Illinois, USA)
 Santiago Silva Retamales (2002.02.16 – 2015.07.07), while Auxiliary Bishop of Valparaíso (Chile)
 Ricardo Orlando Seirutti (2015.11.07 – today), Auxiliary Bishop of Córdoba (Argentina)

References

Sources 
 GCatholic data for all sections
 Raymond Janin, lemma 'Belle' in Dictionnaire d'Histoire et de Géographie ecclésiastiques, vol. VII, 1934, col. 794
 

Catholic titular sees in Europe
Medieval Epirus
Defunct dioceses of the Ecumenical Patriarchate of Constantinople
Populated places of the Byzantine Empire
Byzantine sites in Epirus (region)